Jan Edgar Hårstad (born 23 April 1943) is a Norwegian actor and political writer.

Hårstad played Johannes Rosmer in NRK Fjernsynsteatret's production of Rosmersholm in 1978. Later, he played "Blomster-Johan" in NRK's Christmas show  Amalies jul from 1995.

He writes for publications including the Communist newspaper Friheten, and the website Document.no.

Seelected filmography 
The Witch Hunt (1981)
 Etter Rubicon (1987)
 Mørke Sjeler (Dark Souls) (2011)

Awards 
 1983 – Per Aabels ærespris
 1983 – Nationaltheatrets venners pris

References

External links 

1943 births
Norwegian male film actors
Living people
Norwegian male stage actors